

Ambassadors from England

The first ambassador from England to the Ottoman Empire or Porte was appointed in 1583 under the reign of Elizabeth I.

1583-1588: William Harborne, merchant
1588-1598: Sir Edward Barton
1598-1606: Henry Lello
1606-1611: Sir Thomas Glover
1611-1620: Sir Paul Pindar
1621-1628: Sir Thomas Roe
1627-1641: Sir Peter Wyche
1641-1646: Sir Sackville Crowe
1647-1661: Sir Thomas Bendish
1660-1667: Heneage Finch, 3rd Earl of Winchilsea
1668-1672: Sir Daniel Harvey
1672-1681: Sir John Finch
1681-1687: James Brydges, 8th Baron Chandos
1687-1691: Sir William Trumbull
1691: Sir William Hussey
1691: Sir William Harbord appointed but died en route to Constantinople
1692-1701: William Paget, 6th Baron Paget
1698 James Rushout appointed but died before he could travel to Constantinople

Ambassadors from Great Britain

1700-1717: Sir Robert Sutton
1716-1718: Edward Wortley Montagu husband of writer Lady Mary Wortley Montagu
1718-1730 Abraham Stanyan
1729-1737: George Hay, 8th Earl of Kinnoull
1737-1746: Everard Fawkener (departed 1742)
1742-1747: Stanhope Aspinwall In charge of affairs
1747-1762: Sir James Porter
1761-1764: Henry Grenville
July–November 1765: Robert Colebrooke 
1765-1775: John Murray
1775-1793: Sir Robert Ainslie
1793-1796: Sir Robert Liston
1796 - Francis James Jackson
1796-1799: John Spencer Smith, Minister Plenipotentiary

Ambassadors from the United Kingdom

1799-1803: Thomas Bruce, 7th Earl of Elgin
1803 (Jan-May): Alexander Straton (minister plenipotentiary) 
1803-1804: William Drummond
1804-1807: Charles Arbuthnot
1807-1809  Sir Arthur Paget
1808 and 1809: Sir Robert Adair special mission in 1808, Ambassador in 1809
1809-1812: Stratford Canning (chargé d'affaires in the absence of an ambassador during the Napoleonic Wars)
1812-1820: Sir Robert Liston (his second term)
March–August 1820 Bartholomew Frere - minister plenipotentiary
1820-1824: Percy Clinton, Viscount Strangford
1824-1825: William Turner - minister plenipotentiary
1825-1827: Stratford Canning (again)
1827-1832:  (British Embassy was withdrawn following the Battle of Navarino), during this period Sir Robert Gordon was envoy extraordinary and John Hobart Caradoc led a special mission to Greece and Egypt. Canning returned for a period in 1831-32 for the conferences to determine the borders of Greece, with John Henry Mandeville as minister-plenipotentiary.
1832-1841: John, Lord Ponsonby
Mar-Oct 1841: Charles Bankhead minister-plenipotentiary
1841-1858: Stratford Canning, 1st Viscount Stratford de Redcliffe (again) with Henry Richard Charles Wellesley as minister-plenipotentiary in 1845
1858-1865: Sir Henry Bulwer
1865-1867: Richard Lyons, 1st Baron Lyons
1867-1877: Sir Henry Elliot-Murray-Kynynmound
1877-1880: Sir Henry Layard
May 1880: George Joachim Goschen (special ambassador)
1881-1884: Frederick Hamilton-Temple-Blackwood, 1st Earl of Dufferin
1884-1886: Sir Edward Thornton
1886-1891: Sir William White
1891-1893: Sir Clare Ford
1893-1898: Sir Philip Currie
1898-1908: Sir Nicholas O'Conor-Don
Apr–Jul 1908: Sir George Head Barclay
1908-1913: Sir Gerard Lowther, 1st Baronet
1913-1914: Sir Louis Mallet
1914-1918: no diplomatic relations due to World War I
1918-1919: Somerset Gough-Calthorpe (High Commissioner), also Commander-in-Chief  of the Mediterranean Fleet
1920-1924 Sir Horace Rumbold, 9th Baronet (British Commissioner at Constantinople)
From 1925 onwards, following the formation of the Republic of Turkey, see: List of Ambassadors from the United Kingdom to Turkey

List of other prominent British residents 
1880s Francis Richard Plunkett served as Diplomatic Secretary
1876: Robert Gascoyne-Cecil, 3rd Marquess of Salisbury - Represented Britain at the Six Powers Constantinople Conference.
 late 19th century Sir Edgar Vincent, Director-General of the Imperial Ottoman Bank
 17th century Sir Paul Rycault - Secretary to the Ambassador and Consul in Smyrna.
 Thomas Dallam - organ maker
 William Biddulph Protestant chaplain in Aleppo
 in 1653 the Commonwealth appointed one Richard Lawrence as agent
 1668 - 1671 Sir George Etherege, restoration rake and writer, secretary to Daniel Harvey

References 

Ottoman Empire
 
United Kingdom